Przewoźnik is a surname. Notable people with the surname include:

Andrzej Przewoźnik (1963–2010), Polish historian
Jan Przewoźnik (born 1957), Polish chess player

Polish-language surnames